Ježce is a small settlement in the Primskovo area of the Municipality of Šmartno pri Litiji in central Slovenia. The area is part of the historical region of Lower Carniola. The municipality is now included in the Central Slovenia Statistical Region.

Industry

Ježce is known for its gravel pits. There are three large quarries in Ježce: two north of the village center, and a smaller one to the south.

References

External links
Ježce at Geopedia

Populated places in the Municipality of Šmartno pri Litiji